Jacques Stotzem (born 1959 in Verviers, Belgium) is an acoustic fingerstyle guitar player. He has recorded 3 vinyl albums and 17 CDs, and collaborated with numerous musical projects and other artists.

After having seen, at the age of 16, the American guitar player Stefan Grossman on TV, he taught himself to play the guitar and became a professional musician at the age of 19. He first played in bands and as an accompanist before starting a solo career.

Jacques Stotzem has developed a personal and harmonically refined style, drawing from many different sources such as blues, jazz, rock and folk. He plays with fingerpicks on the thumb and two fingers of the right hand, using the guitar to produce unusual percussive sounds and harmonic effects.

Jacques Stotzem has become a regular guest at the most important European and American festivals and tours around the world, including countries like Japan, China and Taiwan.

In 2003, the Northern Irish company Avalon Guitars introduced a "Jacques Stotzem Signature model" guitar. Since 2006, the C. F. Martin & Company has produced an "OMC Jacques Stotzem Custom Edition".

Jacques Stotzem is also co-founder (with Francis Geron) of the Verviers Guitar Festival.

Discography 
CDs
 2021 - Handmade
 2019 - Places we have been
 2017 - The Way To Go
 2016 - 25 Acoustic Music Years
 2015 - To Rory - acoustic tribute to Rory Gallagher
 2013 - Catch the spirit II
 2011 - Lonely Road
 2008 - Catch the spirit
 2007 - Simple pleasure
 2006 - Colours of Turner - duos with Andre Klenes (double bass)
 2004 - In Concert (Live)
 2002 - Sur Vesdre
 1999 - Connections - with Jacques Pirotton (guitar) and Thierry Crommen (harmonica)
 1997 - Fingerprint - with Thierry Crommen (saxophone)
 1996 - Different Ways - duos with Thierry Crommen (harmonica)
 1995 - Two Bridges - with Thierry Crommen (harmonica)
 1993 - Straight On 
 1991 - Clear Night

Vinyl albums
 1988 - Words from the heart
 1985 - Training
 1982 - Last thought before sleeping

DVDs
 2004 - Jacques Stotzem in Taiwan

Miscellaneous contributions
 2006 - Sophie Galet - Cyclus
 2005 - Miam Monster Miam - Soleil Noir
 2003 - Miam Monster Miam - Forgotten Ladies
 1997 - Marcel Dadi - Hommage
 1994 - CD Paysages Acoustiques - "10e édition des Stages Internationaux de Musique".

References

External links 
 
 Martin guitar company

Fingerstyle guitarists
Living people
1959 births